Haccombe is a hamlet, former parish and historic manor in Devon, situated 2 1/2 miles east of Newton Abbot, in the south of the county. It is possibly the smallest parish in England, and was said in 1810 to be remarkable for containing only two inhabited houses, namely the manor house known as Haccombe House and the parsonage. Haccombe House is a "nondescript Georgian structure" (Pevsner), rebuilt shortly before 1795 by the Carew family on the site of an important mediaeval manor house.

Next to the house is the small parish church dedicated to Saint Blaise, remarkable not only for the many ancient stone sculpted effigies and monumental brasses it contains, amongst the best in Devon, but also because the incumbent has the rare title of Archpriest and is accountable not to the local bishop (Bishop of Exeter), as are all other parish churches in Devon, but to the Archbishop of Canterbury. The archpresbytery was established in 1341 with six clergy; only the archpriest survived at the Reformation. The ecclesiastical parish is now combined with that of Stoke-in-Teignhead with Combe-in-Teignhead. Haccombe with Combe is a civil parish in the Teignbridge local government district.

Persons to have held the office of Archpriest of Haccombe include:
1581-1594: John Woolton (1535?–1594), Bishop of Exeter from 1579 to 1594, who "as the bishopric had become of small value, was allowed to hold with it the place of archpriest at Haccombe (20 Oct. 1581) and the rectory of Lezant in Cornwall (1584)".

Manor

The manor was the seat of important branches of the Courtenay and Carew families.

References

Sources 
Cherry, Bridget & Pevsner, Nikolaus, The Buildings of England: Devon. Yale University Press, 2004. 
Risdon, Tristram (died 1640), Survey of Devon. With considerable additions. London, 1811.
Vivian, Lt.Col. J.L., (Ed.) The Visitations of the County of Devon: Comprising the Heralds' Visitations of 1531, 1564 & 1620. Exeter, 1895.

Hamlets in Devon
Former civil parishes in Devon